Kidangoor may refer to:

Kidangoor, Kottayam, a town in Kerala, India
Kidangoor, Ernakulam, a town in Kerala, India